John Collins (born 24 January 1989) is a British rower. He competed at the Olympics in the Double Sculls event at both the 2016 Rio and 2020 Tokyo Olympics. 

Collins won a silver medal at the 2017 World Rowing Championships in Sarasota, Florida, as part of the quadruple sculls with Jack Beaumont, Jonathan Walton, and Graeme Thomas.

In 2021, he won a European bronze medal in the double sculls in Varese, Italy.

In October 2021, Collins completed the 'Metro Marathon Challenge' running 305 miles while visiting 315 London Underground stations, then running the London Marathon within two weeks.

Collins is a member of Leander Club having joined in 2010.  In December 2021, he was announced as the new Club Captain.

References

External links
 John Collins at Rowing Classifieds
 

1989 births
Living people
British male rowers
Olympic rowers of Great Britain
Rowers at the 2016 Summer Olympics
Rowers at the 2020 Summer Olympics
Place of birth missing (living people)
World Rowing Championships medalists for Great Britain
European Rowing Championships medalists